Ufa Maximovka Airport  is an airport in Bashkortostan, Russia located in the northeast part of Ufa. Services small transport aircraft.  It is secondary to the larger Ufa Airport southwest of the city.

Airports built in the Soviet Union
Airports in Bashkortostan
Transport in Ufa